Jacek Zieliński may refer to two Polish football coaches:
 Jacek Zieliński (footballer, born 1961)
 Jacek Zieliński (footballer, born 1967)

See also